In mathematics, a cardinal λ < Θ is a Suslin cardinal if there exists a set P ⊂ 2ω such that P is λ-Suslin but P is not λ'-Suslin for any λ' < λ. It is named after the Russian mathematician
Mikhail Yakovlevich Suslin (1894–1919).

See also
Suslin representation
Suslin line
AD+

References

 Howard Becker, The restriction of a Borel equivalence relation to a sparse set, Arch. Math. Logic 42, 335–347 (2003), 

Cardinal numbers